is a physician and a Japanese author, most known for his ideas regarding the "Japanese brain".

Theory
According to Tsunoda's theory, the Japanese people use their brains in a unique way, different from "western" brains. The Japanese brain, argues Tsunoda, hears or processes music using the left hemisphere, where western brains use the opposite or right hemisphere to process music. Tsunoda further argues that brains use languages as operating systems, thus the user "giving meaning to vowels." Tsunoda has had one essay, "An approach to an integrated sensorimotor system in the human central brain and a subconscious computer", included in a prestigious British publication, Sociocultural Studies of Mind (1995), edited by James V. Wertsch, Pablo del Rio, and Amelia Alvarez.

Criticism
Journalist Karel van Wolferen has written of Tsunoda that "his testing methods are highly suspect. My impression, based on an account by one of his foreign guinea-pigs, is that auto-suggestion plays an important role. Yet his books sell well in Japan, and his views have been officially credited to the extent of being introduced abroad by the semi-governmental Japan Foundation".

See also
Pseudoscience
Nihonjinron
Essentialism

Notes

Japanese writers
Neuropsychologists
Year of birth missing (living people)
Living people